The first season of Monk originally aired in the United States on USA Network from July 12 to October 18, 2002, which consisted of 13 episodes. Tony Shalhoub, Bitty Schram, Ted Levine, and Jason Gray-Stanford were introduced as portraying the main characters.  Tony Shalhoub portrayed Adrian Monk, the title character, an OCD homicide detective from San Francisco, who was removed from the force after the murder of his wife. A DVD of the season was released on June 15, 2003.

Crew
David Hoberman was the first to sign on to the ABC project, pitching a show about a "cop with obsessive-compulsive disorder."  He then invited Andy Breckman to become the show's creator; Breckman accepted the offer, and would ultimately serve as the showrunner of Monk throughout its entire eight-season run.  Breckman wrote a script for the pilot episode, which he called "Mr. Monk and the Candidate".  It was originally to be an hour-long pilot, but due to lead actor Tony Shalhoub's prior contract limitations, it was forced to become a feature-length made-for-TV movie (Shalhoub's prior contract was subsequently cancelled, which gave him the freedom to join Monk).  Dean Parisot was selected to direct the pilot episode.  He would not return to the series until the final season, for "Mr. Monk and the Badge".  Various other directors were hired for the subsequent episodes, including Randall Zisk and Adam Arkin.  Writers for the season included Tom Scharpling, David Breckman, and Hy Conrad, among others.  Conrad was nominated for an Edgar Award for his work on "Mr. Monk Takes a Vacation".  Jeff Beal was hired to write the theme song, for which he won an Emmy.

Cast

Casting for the show began as early as 1998, when Monk was being developed for ABC.  By the time Tony Shalhoub was finally chosen for the role of Adrian Monk, USA Network had taken over the project, and several prominent actors had been considered for the part.  Such actors included Dave Foley, John Ritter, Henry Winkler, Stanley Tucci, Alfred Molina, and, most seriously, Michael Richards.  Tucci and Molina would later go on to guest star in the series in "Mr. Monk and the Actor" and "Mr. Monk and the Naked Man", respectively.  David Hoberman, executive producer of the show, stated, "I can't express how depressing those casting sessions were." He went on to say that "we had people coming in doing tics and Tourette's syndrome."  Eventually, however, Shalhoub was given the part of the obsessive-compulsive detective.

The role of Sharona Fleming was also difficult to cast. In the story notes, her character was described as "Sassy. Outspoken. No BS." Queen Latifah was one of the many actresses considered before Bitty Schram was given the part. Stottlemeyer (originally named Chief Rockwell) was much easier to cast, with Ted Levine being one of the earliest choices for the sometimes-annoyed but generally forgiving captain of the SFPD.  Jason Gray-Stanford was cast in the pilot as Randy Deacon, a minor role. However, after production, Andy Breckman (the show's creator) is said to have pulled Gray-Stanford aside, where he asked if he would like to be a costar. Gray-Stanford said yes, and the role of Randy Disher, the oblivious but lovable SFPD lieutenant, was created. Breckman later stated "I couldn't have imagined doing it without him."

Stanley Kamel was given the recurring part of Monk's beloved psychiatrist, Dr. Charles Kroger. In the pilot episode, however, he was given a starring credit.  Kane Ritchotte and Max Morrow were chosen to portray Benjy Fleming, Sharona's son, throughout several episodes. Amy Sedaris appeared as Sharona's sister Gail. Stellina Rusich, a Canadian actress, was given the part of Trudy Monk, Monk's wife, who was murdered in a car bomb five years before the series began. Rusich appeared in the pilot and one subsequent episode.

For the first appearance in the series of recurring villain "Dale the Whale", Adam Arkin played the part, which was later taken over by Tim Curry. Other prominent guest stars, many but not all Canadian, were chosen for the season, including Brooke Adams (Shalhoub's wife), Hrant Alianak, David Anderson, Ben Bass, John Bourgeois, Cameron Daddo, Jennifer Dale, Tim Daly, Maria del Mar, Polly Draper, Robin Duke, Fred Ewanuick, Michael Hogan, Rob LaBelle, Jenny Levine, Linda Kash, J. C. MacKenzie, Carl Marotte, Garry Marshall, Stephen McHattie, Kevin Nealon, Willie Nelson, Gail O'Grady, Peter Outerbridge, Christopher Shyer, and Jessica Steen.

Episodes

A (HH) listed next to a viewership number indicates the number of household viewers, and a (25-54) indicates the number of viewers aged 25-54. These are only used if total viewership numbers were unavailable for that particular episode.

Reception
The first season received positive reviews from critics. On Metacritic, the first season holds a 75 out of 100 based on 21 reviews, indicating "generally favorable reviews".

Awards and nominations

Emmy Awards
Outstanding Actor – Comedy Series (Tony Shalhoub for playing "Adrian Monk")
Outstanding Main Title Theme Music (Jeff Beal)

Golden Globe Awards
Best Actor – Musical or Comedy Series (Tony Shalhoub for playing "Adrian Monk")

Gallery
Season 1 was filmed in Toronto, Ontario, Canada.

References

Monk (TV series)
2002 American television seasons
Monk (TV series) seasons